Archbishop Hannan High School is a Catholic, co-ed, high school located in St. Tammany Parish, Louisiana, United States. Its mascot is called Harry The Hawk.  The school's motto is Caritas Viniculum Perfectionis, which translates to "charity leads to perfection."   It is located in the Roman Catholic Archdiocese of New Orleans.

The school is named for the late Philip M. Hannan, Archbishop of New Orleans from 1965 to 1989.

The Old Campus (St. Bernard Parish Campus) 
The old Hannan campus, located at 2501 Archbishop Philip M. Hannan Boulevard in Meraux, was destroyed by Hurricane Katrina in 2005. The campus was situated on Archbishop Philip M. Hannan Boulevard, between East Judge Perez Drive and St. Bernard Highway. The school was completely air-conditioned and included Our Lady of Peace Chapel, separate boys' and girls' athletic facilities (including a baseball stadium, softball field, and lighted football stadium), a large library and media center, a science wing, networked computer laboratories, a state-of-the-art foreign language lab, and a Fine Arts Complex that included a 200-seat auditorium, band room, art studio, and journalism lab.

Before its destruction the old campus was in its seventeenth year in operation as the only Catholic high school in St. Bernard Parish.

Athletics
Archbishop Hannan athletics competes in the LHSAA.

Hannan sports teams:
Football
Boys' basketball
Girls' basketball 
Track
Cross country
Baseball
Softball 
Bowling 
Golf
Girls' soccer
Volleyball
Wrestling

Championships
Boys' Basketball State Championship: 2022
Bowling State Championship: 2005 (undefeated state champions in 2005, the first year bowling was considered a state sport)
Softball State Championship: 2022
Volleyball State Championship: 2021

Notable alumni
 Tommy Manzella, former MLB player (Houston Astros)

References

External links
 Arch. Hannan High home page

Private middle schools in Louisiana
Catholic secondary schools in Louisiana
Catholic secondary schools in New Orleans
Schools in St. Bernard Parish, Louisiana
Schools in St. Tammany Parish, Louisiana